WISE J0005+3737, full designation WISE J000517.48+373720.5, is a brown dwarf of spectral class T9, located in constellation Andromeda at approximately 23 light-years from Earth.

Discovery
WISE J0005+3737 was discovered in 2012 by Mace et al. from data, collected by Wide-field Infrared Survey Explorer (WISE) Earth-orbiting satellite — NASA infrared-wavelength 40 cm (16 in) space telescope, which mission lasted from December 2009 to February 2011. The discovery paper was published in March 2013.

Distance
Currently the most accurate distance estimate of WISE J0005+3737 is a trigonometric parallax, published in 2019 by Kirkpatrick et al.:  pc, or  ly.

References

Brown dwarfs
T-type stars
Andromeda (constellation)
WISE objects
?